European Heartbreak is the second studio album by Dutch singer-songwriter Amber Arcades. It was released on 28 September 2018, under Heavenly Recordings.

Release
On 12 April 2018, the song "Goodnight Europe" was released as a single. It was accompanied by a short film which indicated some of the themes from the forthcoming album and previewed excerpts from both the single and other songs, though at this point there was no formal announcement about its release. On 23 April, Amber Arcades announced the release of the new album, along with another single "Simple Song". The third single "Alpine Town" was released on 23 July 2018. Amber Arcades said of the single: I wrote this song exactly a year ago while on holiday in Guillestre, a small town in the French Alps. I was kind of in a sad place and my boyfriend had dragged me along to get away from all that, but I guess it doesn't really work like that, ha. It just made me reflect on the sad part of the tourist condition as a metaphor for life. The fourth single "Where Did You Go" was released on 6 August 2018.

Critical reception
European Heartbreak was met with "generally favorable" reviews from critics. At Metacritic, which assigns a weighted average rating out of 100 to reviews from mainstream publications, this release received an average score of 74, based on 11 reviews. Aggregator Album of the Year gave the release a 71 out of 100 based on a critical consensus of 12 reviews.

Track listing

Personnel

Musicians
 Annelotte de Graaf – primary artist, guitar
 Taylor Barnett – trumpet
 Nathaniel Lee – trombone
 Anna Bishop – violin
 Jason McComb – cello
 Meg Duffy – bass
 Treesa Gold – violin
 Adrian Pintea – violin
 Ellen Riccio – violin
 Schuyler Slack – cello
 Manuel Van Den Berg – keyboards
 Rob Quallich – trumpet
 Cameron Ralston – bass
 Ben Culver – trombone
 Daniel Clarke – keyboards
 Pinson Chanselle – percussion
 Colin Killalea – backing vocals

Production
 Chris Cohen – producer
 Trey Pollard – producer, engineer, string arranger
 Guy Davies – mastering
 Adrian Olsen – engineer
 Ali Chant – mixer
 Nick Helderman – photography

References

External links
 
 

2018 albums
Heavenly Recordings albums